Marco Castoldi (born 23 December 1972), better known by his stage name Morgan, is an Italian singer and musician. His musical genres are mainly alternative rock and electronic rock, sometimes experimental rock and synthpop. He has also been a judge for seven seasons in the Italian version of The X Factor, winning five of them through acts he mentored: Aram Quartet (series 1 - 2008), Matteo Becucci (series 2 - 2008–9), Marco Mengoni (series 3 - 2009), Chiara Galiazzo (series 6 - 2012) and Michele Bravi (series 7 - 2013).

He is also a founding member of Bluvertigo, an Italian band formed in 1992.

Discography

Solo
2003: Canzoni dell'appartamento
2004: Il suono della vanità
2005: Non al denaro, non all'amore né al cielo
2007: Da A ad A
2008: È successo a Morgan
2009: Italian Songbook Volume 1
2010: Morganicomio
2012: Italian Songbook Volume 2

With Bluvertigo
1995: Acidi e basi
1997: Metallo non metallo
1999: Zero - ovvero la famosa nevicata dell'85
2001: Pop Tools
2008: MTV Storytellers (live)

Collaborations
 Franco Battiato in album Gommalacca
 Antonella Ruggiero in Registrazioni moderne
 Alice in her albums Exit, Personal Juke Box and Viaggio in Italia
 Subsonica in Discoteca Labirinto
 Cristina Donà in album Nido
 Paola & Chiara in Arsenico
 Mauro Pagani in Parole a caso
 Banco del Mutuo Soccorso in No palco
 Modena City Ramblers in Appunti partigiani
 Patty Pravo in Il vento e le rose
 Artisti uniti per l'Abruzzo in Domani 21/04.09
 Bugo in Sincero

Producer
 Mao in Black Mokette
 Soerba in Playback
 La Sintesi in L'eroe romantico
 Aram Quartet in the song Chi (Who)

Filmography
2002: Perduto amor by Franco Battiato
2003: Il siero della vanità by Alex Infascelli - musician
2004: Ingannevole è il cuore più di ogni cosa by Asia Argento - musician
2006: Transylvania of Tony Gatlif - interpreters Milan
2006: Il quarto sesso (2006) of Marco Costa - musician, interprets Karl Marx

Bibliography
1998: Dissoluzione (Bompiani - I buchi neri)
2008: In pArte Morgan (Eleuthera)
2014: "Il libro di Morgan - Io l'Amore la Musica gli Stronzi e Dio" (Einaudi stile libero)

External links

 Morgan official website
 Bluvertigo Myspace site
 Morgan's discography on Rockit.it

Living people
Singers from Milan
People from Brianza
People from Monza
Italian rock musicians
Italian pianists
Italian keyboardists
Italian bass guitarists
Male bass guitarists
Alternative rock musicians
Italian male singer-songwriters
1972 births
Italian male pianists
21st-century Italian  male singers
21st-century pianists
21st-century bass guitarists